The Sheepheaven Creek redband trout is a local Californian variety of the rainbow trout (Oncorhynchus mykiss), a freshwater fish in the family Salmonidae. It is considered either a distinct western form of the McCloud River redband trout (subspecies Oncorhynchus mykiss stonei), or a subspecies of its own, which has not been scientifically named and described yet. It is native to Sheepheaven Creek, Siskiyou County, California, United States. It has been transplanted into Swamp Creek in 1972 and 1974 and into Trout Creek in 1977. They can now be found in both locations. Sheepheaven Creek redband are found to be the most distinct among all other trout groups, and therefore has been suggested to merit recognition as a new subspecies. They have the fewest gill rakers of any western trout.

References

Oncorhynchus
Trout, Sheepheaven
Trout, Sheepheaven
Trout, Sheepheaven
Natural history of the California Coast Ranges
Natural history of Siskiyou County, California
Undescribed vertebrate species